The Italian Chemical Society is the national association in Italy representing the chemical sciences. Its main aim is to promote and support the development of chemistry and scientific research, spreading the knowledge of chemistry and its applications in order to improve the welfare of the country, establishing and maintaining relations with organizations from other countries with similar purposes and promoting the study of this subject at school and university.

History
The Italian Chemical Society was formed in 1909 by the union of two existing societies, the Chemical Society of Rome, founded in 1902, and the Chemical Society of Milan, founded in 1895. The two original societies became sections of the new one and a third section was added in 1910, when the Chemical Society of Naples was incorporated.

During the First World War the activity of the society experienced a marked decrease and the link among the three sections got was loosened, with the result that, in 1919, the section in Milan claimed its independence and became the Society of Industrial Chemistry.

In 1928 the Society of Industrial Chemistry of Milan and the Society of General and Applied Chemistry of Rome merged into the Italian Association of Chemistry, which finally assumed the name of Italian Chemical Society on 1 January 1947, maintaining exactly the same structure as before.

Publications

Leadership
The President of the Society is Professor Angela Agostiano.

References

External links
 

Chemical industry in Italy
Chemistry societies
Scientific societies based in Italy
1909 establishments in Italy